Deportivo Mandiyú may refer to two Argentine football clubs:

Deportivo Mandiyú, a club founded in 1952 and bankrupt from 1996 to 2010.
Textil Mandiyú, a club founded in 1998 as a tribute to Deportivo Mandiyú.